Marta Villanueva Cárdenas, known by her pseudonyms Luz de Viana and Marta Villanueva, (b. 25 December 1900 – d. 1995) was a Chilean writer and painter. She specialized in novels and short stories.

Biography
Marta Villanueva Cárdenas was born in Santiago, Chile. Her first published work was No sirve la Luna blanca (1945), for which she won the Athena Award from the University of Concepción. She is assigned to the "School of Subjectivity" of feminine literature in Chile and of contemporary Chilean writers. As a painter, under the pseudonym Marta Villanueva, she is included in the Grupo Montparnasse. Her husband was Alfonso Bulnes Calvo (1885–1970), Chilean historian, essayist and diplomat. She died in Santiago.

Cárdenas studied art at the Académie de la Grande Chaumière and studio of André Lothe in Paris.

In 1945, Cárdenas received the Athena Award.

Citations

References

 
 
 
 
 
 

1900 births
1995 deaths
Chilean centenarians
Chilean women short story writers
Chilean women novelists
20th-century Chilean novelists
20th-century Chilean short story writers
20th-century Chilean women writers
Writers from Santiago
20th-century Chilean painters
Chilean women painters
Chilean painters
20th-century women artists
Artists from Santiago
Women centenarians
Chilean feminist writers